Imad Ali Suleiman Al-Hosni (born 18 July 1984), commonly known as Imad Al-Hosni or Al-Amda, is an Omani footballer who last played for Fanja SC in the Oman Professional League.

Club career

Al-Khaburah
He started his professional football career in 2003 and joined the Omani sports club Al-Khaburah SC. In the 2003–04 Omani League, he made 20 appearances and scored 11 goals.

Al-Riyadh
Amad then moved to Saudi Arabian football club Al-Riyadh based in Riyadh. In the 2004–05 Saudi Premier League, he made 23 appearances and scored 10 goals.

Qatar SC
Amad moved to Qatar SC in 2005, a Qatari football club based in Doha. In the 2005–06 Qatar Stars League, he made 25 appearances and scored 14 goals helping the club to be the runners-up. Also in the 2006 Qatar Crown Prince Cup, he made 3 appearances and scored 1 goal helping the club win the runners-up place. In the 2006–07 Qatar Stars League, he made 24 appearances and scored 11 goals. And in the 2007–08 Qatar Stars League, he made 27 appearances and scored 12 goals.

Al-Rayyan
He then moved to another Qatar based sports club Al-Rayyan Sports Club . In the 2008–09 Qatar Stars League, he made 27 appearances and scored 11 goals until his contract expired in 2009.

Charleroi
Amad moved to R. Charleroi S.C., a Belgian football club. He made 8 appearances but couldn't score a single goal. His transfer to Europe had made him the second Omani footballer to play in Europe, after Ali Al-Habsi.

Return to Al-Rayyan
In 2010, he returned to his ex-club Al-Rayyan Sports Club and helped them to win the 2010 Emir of Qatar Cup. He made 8 appearances and scored 4 goals.

Al-Ahli
Amad then moved to Al-Ahli SC. He helped the club in winning the King Cup of Champions in 2011 and 2012, also he helped the club to be the runners-up of 2012 AFC Champions League. His standing record in Al-Ahli was 99 appearances with 52 goals.

Al-Nassr
On 22 December 2013, he signed a six-months contract with Saudi Arabian giants Al-Nassr FC.

Saham
On 8 September 2014, he signed a one-year contract with 2014 GCC Champions League runners-up Saham SC. He made his Oman Professional League debut and scored his first goal on 13 September 2014 in a 3-0 win over Al-Oruba SC.

Club career statistics

International career

Arabian Gulf Cup
Amad has made appearances in the 16th Arabian Gulf Cup, the 17th Arabian Gulf Cup, the 18th Arabian Gulf Cup, the 19th Arabian Gulf Cup, the 20th Arabian Gulf Cup and the 21st Arabian Gulf Cup.

He has been in the national squad since 2003, and he first showed his talent during the 16th Arabian Gulf Cup, scoring a goal in a 1-0 win over the Arabian giants Saudi Arabia. In the tournament, Oman finished at the fourth place, hence reaching its best ever position in the Arabian Gulf Cup competition, reaching the final four round for the first time, with eight points from two wins and two draws.

In the 17th Arabian Gulf Cup, he scored four goals. A brace each in a 3-1 over Iraq and in a 3-2 win over Bahrain hence helping his country to reach the semi-finals and then the finals of the Arabian Gulf Cup for the first time. But Oman lost in the final to the hosts, Qatar in a penalty shootout after the goalkeeping sensation Ali Al-Habsi missed a penalty. Qatar won the match 6-5 on penalties after the match had ended 1-1 at normal time. Amad was awarded with the "Top Goal Scorer" award of the competition.

He scored two goals in the 18th Arabian Gulf Cup, one in a 2-1 win over the hosts the United Arab Emirates and another in a 2-1 win over Kuwait. This was the second time when Oman reached to the finals but again they lost to the hosts, the United Arab Emirates. Ismail Matar, the Emirati legend, scored the lone goal of the match as United Arab Emirates won their first ever Arabian Gulf Cup.

Finally in 2009, he helped his team to win their first ever Arabian Gulf Cup trophy. He scored one goal in the 19th Arabian Gulf Cup in a 4-0 win over Iraq.

He scored one and the only goal of Oman in the 20th Arabian Gulf Cup in a 1-1 draw against Bahrain. Oman failed to qualify for the semi-finals.

In the 21st Arabian Gulf Cup, he played in three matches but failed to score a single goal. Oman again could score only one goal and this time it was from the spot by youngster Hussain Al-Hadhri in a 1-2 loss against Qatar. Oman failed to qualify for the semi-finals.

AFC Asian Cup
Amad has made appearances in the 2004 AFC Asian Cup qualification, the 2004 AFC Asian Cup, the 2007 AFC Asian Cup qualification, the 2007 AFC Asian Cup, the 2011 AFC Asian Cup qualification and the 2015 AFC Asian Cup qualification.

He scored three goals in the 2004 AFC Asian Cup which included a brace in a 2-2 draw against Iran and a goal in a 2-0 win over Thailand. In the tournament, Oman won four points in a 2-0 win over Thailand and a 2-2 draw against Iran and hence failed to qualify for the quarter-finals.

In the 2007 AFC Asian Cup qualification, he scored two goals, one in a 4-1 win over Pakistan and another in the return leg in a 5-0 win over Pakistan and again helped his team to qualify for the 2007 AFC Asian Cup. Badar Al-Maimani scored one and the only goal of Oman in the 2007 AFC Asian Cup in a 1-1 draw against Australia. In the tournament, Oman won two points in a 1-1 draw against Australia and in a 0-0 draw against Iraq and hence failed to qualify for the quarter-finals.

In the 2011 AFC Asian Cup qualification, he played in five matches but failed to score a single goal. Oman failed to qualify for the 2011 AFC Asian Cup.

He made two appearances in the 2015 AFC Asian Cup qualification, scoring one goal in the penultimate game in a 3-1 win over Singapore and again helped his team to qualify for the 2015 AFC Asian Cup by finishing at the top of the Group A.

FIFA World Cup Qualification
Amad has made six appearances in the 2006 FIFA World Cup qualification, seven in the 2010 FIFA World Cup qualification and fifteen in the 2014 FIFA World Cup qualification.

He scored two goals in the 2006 FIFA World Cup qualification, one in the Second Round of FIFA World Cup qualification in a 5-1 win over India and another also in the Second Round in a 2-0 win over Singapore.

He scored a brace in the 2010 FIFA World Cup qualification in the Third Round of FIFA World Cup qualification in a 2-1 win over Thailand.

He scored two goals in the 2014 FIFA World Cup qualification, one in the Second Round of FIFA World Cup qualification in a 2-0 win over Myanmar and another in the Third Round of FIFA World Cup qualification in a 1-0 win over Australia in the third round in a crucial home match which eventually helped Oman to qualify for the fourth round. Oman entered the last game of group play with a chance to qualify for at least the playoff-round, but a 1-0 loss to Jordan eliminated them from contention.

National team career statistics

Goals for Senior National Team
Scores and results list Oman's goal tally first.

Honours

Club
With Qatar SC
Qatar Stars League Runners-up: 2005-06
Qatar Crown Prince Cup Runners-up: 2006

With Al-Rayyan
Emir of Qatar Cup (1): 2010; Runners-up: 2009
Qatar Crown Prince Cup Runners-up: 2009

With Al-Ahli
Saudi Professional League Runners-up: 2011-12
King Cup of Champions (2): 2011, 2012
AFC Champions League Runners-up: 2012

With Al-Nassr
Saudi Professional League (1): 2013-14
Saudi Crown Prince Cup (1): 2013-14

National Team
Arabian Gulf Cup (1): 2009; Runners-up: 2004, 2007

Individual
Arabian Gulf Cup Top Scorer: 2004
Arabian Gulf Cup Best Player of the Tournament: 2004

See also
 List of men's footballers with 100 or more international caps

References

External links
 
 
 Amad Al-Hosni at Goal.com
 
 
 Amad Al-Hosni - ASIAN CUP Australia 2015

1984 births
Living people
People from Muscat, Oman
Omani footballers
Oman international footballers
Omani expatriate footballers
Association football forwards
2004 AFC Asian Cup players
2007 AFC Asian Cup players
2015 AFC Asian Cup players
FIFA Century Club
Al-Khabourah SC players
Al-Riyadh SC players
Qatar SC players
Al-Rayyan SC players
R. Charleroi S.C. players
Al-Ahli Saudi FC players
Al Nassr FC players
Saham SC players
Fanja SC players
Saudi Professional League players
Qatar Stars League players
Belgian Pro League players
Oman Professional League players
Expatriate footballers in Saudi Arabia
Omani expatriate sportspeople in Saudi Arabia
Expatriate footballers in Qatar
Omani expatriate sportspeople in Qatar
Expatriate footballers in Belgium
Omani expatriate sportspeople in Belgium
Footballers at the 2006 Asian Games
Asian Games competitors for Oman